The canton of Marmande-2 is an administrative division of the Lot-et-Garonne department, southwestern France. It was created at the French canton reorganisation which came into effect in March 2015. Its seat is in Marmande.

It consists of the following communes:
 
Birac-sur-Trec
Caumont-sur-Garonne
Fauguerolles
Fourques-sur-Garonne
Gontaud-de-Nogaret
Longueville
Marmande (partly)
Saint-Pardoux-du-Breuil
Samazan
Taillebourg
Virazeil

References

Cantons of Lot-et-Garonne